The 1988 Badminton World Cup was the tenth edition of an international tournament Badminton World Cup. The event was held in September 1988. China won titles in all 5 disciplines.

Medalists

Men's singles

Finals

Women's singles

Finals

Men's doubles

Finals

Women's doubles

Finals

Mixed doubles

Finals

References 

 https://web.archive.org/web/20061214225019/http://tangkis.tripod.com/world/1988.htm
 
 China set their sights on Seoul

Badminton World Cup
1988 in badminton
1988 in Thai sport
Sports competitions in Bangkok
International sports competitions hosted by Thailand